Robert Choe (born 13 January 1940 in Malacca) is a former Malacca FA and Malaysia player in the 1950s–1960s.

Career overview
A Striker, Robert was a squad player for Malaya that captured the 1958, 1959 and 1960 Merdeka Tournament editions.

In 1959, he was selected for the inaugural Asian Youth Championship. On 16 December 1961, Robert help the national team's to win the gold medal in the 1961 SEAP Games (now SEA Games) in Rangoon, the Burmese (now Myanmar) after beating the Burma in the finals.

He also a part of the Malaya player that winning bronze medals in the 1962 Asian Games.

In 1962, he was also offered by Eintracht Frankfurt and Tottenham Hotspur (along with Abdul Ghani Minhat) to attend a trial session.

At the 1966 Asian Games in Bangkok, Robert was honored to captain the national squad before announcing his retirement from the international stage at the age of 26 to focus on a career as a banker.

Personal life
On 24 October 1964, after married with Alice Choe, the couple was blessed with a pair of sons, Fahrian Choe Choon Huah and Timothy Choe Choon Seng. Fahrian was named after Germany's goalkeeper at the 1962 World Cup, Wolfgang Fahrian, who became Robert friend when traveling to Europe. "Fahrian was happy to know that I named my first child after him," said Robert.

Honours

Malacca
Malaysia FAM Cup runner-up: 1957, 1958

Malaysia U19
AFC Youth Championship runner-up: 1959, 1960

Malaysia
Southeast Asian Peninsular Games: 1961 
Asian Games: Bronze Medal 1962
Pestabola Merdeka: 1958, 1959, 1960

References

Living people
Malaysian footballers
1940 births
People from Malacca
Association football forwards
Malacca FA players